Torino is an album by the UK band Cinerama.  It was released on July 2, 2002, on Manifesto Records.

Track listing
All tracks composed by David Gedge and Simon Cleave
 "And When She Was Bad" – 2:53 
 "Two Girls" – 2:43
 "Estrella" – 3:15
 "Cat Girl Tights" – 5:03
 "Airborne" – 2:06
 "Quick, Before It Melts" – 5:03
 "Tie Me Up" – 4:15
 "Careless" – 2:53
 "Close Up" – 4:17
 "Starry Eyed" – 2:54
 "Get Up and Go" – 4:24
 "Get Smart" – 3:31
 "Health and Efficiency" – 6:25

Personnel
Cinerama
David Gedge - vocals, guitar
Simon Cleave - guitar
Sally Murrell - keyboards, vocals
Terry de Castro - bass, vocals
Kari Paavola - drums

References

2002 albums
Albums produced by Steve Albini